Jerup railway station is a railway station serving the village of Jerup in Vendsyssel, Denmark.

The station is located on the Skagensbanen railway line from Skagen to Frederikshavn between Napstjært and Rimmen halts. The train services are currently operated by Nordjyske Jernbaner which run frequent local train services between Skagen station and Frederikshavn station.

History 

The station opened in 1890 when the railway started.

In 2006 the station was renovated with new platforms and a new shelter.

Operations 
The train services are currently operated by the railway company Nordjyske Jernbaner (NJ) which run frequent local train services from Skagen station to Frederikshavn station with onward connections to the rest of Denmark.

Architecture 
The original station building was heavily rebuilt in 1922 after designs by the Danish architect Ulrik Plesner.

See also
 List of railway stations in Denmark

References

Bibliography

External links

 Nordjyske Jernbaner – Danish railway company operating in North Jutland Region
 Danske Jernbaner – website with information on railway history in Denmark
 Nordjyllands Jernbaner – website with information on railway history in North Jutland

Railway stations in the North Jutland Region
Railway stations opened in 1890
Ulrik Plesner railway stations
Railway stations in Denmark opened in the 19th century